= List of counties of England by area in 1871 =

This is a list of historic counties of England by area as at the 1871 census. Note that Monmouthshire was considered to be part of England at the time.

| Rank | County | Area |
|---|---|---|
| 1 | Yorkshire | 3,830,567 acres (15,501.75 km^{2}) |
| 2 | Lincolnshire | 1,775,457 acres (7,185.02 km^{2}) |
| 3 | Devon | 1,657,180 acres (6,706.4 km^{2}) |
| 4 | Norfolk | 1,354,301 acres (5,480.66 km^{2}) |
| 5 | Northumberland | 1,249,299 acres (5,055.73 km^{2}) |
| 6 | Lancashire | 1,219,221 acres (4,934.01 km^{2}) |
| 7 | Hampshire | 1,070,216 acres (4,331.01 km^{2}) |
| 8 | Essex | 1,060,549 acres (4,291.89 km^{2}) |
| 9 | Somerset | 1,047,220 acres (4,237.9 km^{2}) |
| 10 | Kent | 1,039,419 acres (4,206.38 km^{2}) |
| 11 | Cumberland | 1,001,273 acres (4,052.01 km^{2}) |
| 12 | Suffolk | 947,681 acres (3,835.13 km^{2}) |
| 13 | Sussex | 936,911 acres (3,791.54 km^{2}) |
| 14 | Cornwall | 873,600 acres (3,535 km^{2}) |
| 15 | Wiltshire | 865,092 acres (3,500.90 km^{2}) |
| 16 | Shropshire | 826,055 acres (3,342.93 km^{2}) |
| 17 | Gloucestershire | 805,102 acres (3,258.13 km^{2}) |
| 18 | Staffordshire | 728,468 acres (2,948.01 km^{2}) |
| 19 | Cheshire | 707,078 acres (2,861.44 km^{2}) |
| 20 | Derbyshire | 658,803 acres (2,666.08 km^{2}) |
| 21 | Dorset | 632,025 acres (2,557.71 km^{2}) |
| 22 | Northamptonshire | 630,358 acres (2,550.97 km^{2}) |
| 23 | Durham | 622,476 acres (2,519.07 km^{2}) |
| 24 | Warwickshire | 563,946 acres (2,282.21 km^{2}) |
| 25 | Herefordshire | 534,823 acres (2,164.35 km^{2}) |
| 26 | Cambridgeshire | 525,152 acres (2,125.21 km^{2}) |
| 27 | Nottinghamshire | 525,076 acres (2,124.91 km^{2}) |
| 28 | Leicestershire | 514,164 acres (2,080.75 km^{2}) |
| 29 | Westmorland | 485,432 acres (1,964.47 km^{2}) |
| 30 | Surrey | 478,492 acres (1,936.39 km^{2}) |
| 31 | Oxfordshire | 472,717 acres (1,913.02 km^{2}) |
| 32 | Worcestershire | 472,165 acres (1,910.78 km^{2}) |
| 33 | Buckinghamshire | 466,932 acres (1,889.61 km^{2}) |
| 34 | Berkshire | 451,210 acres (1,826.0 km^{2}) |
| 35 | Hertfordshire | 391,141 acres (1,582.89 km^{2}) |
| 36 | Monmouthshire | 368,399 acres (1,490.86 km^{2}) |
| 37 | Bedfordshire | 295,582 acres (1,196.18 km^{2}) |
| 38 | Huntingdonshire | 229,544 acres (928.93 km^{2}) |
| 39 | Middlesex | 180,136 acres (728.98 km^{2}) |
| 40 | Rutland | 95,805 acres (387.71 km^{2}) |
